Cryptandra monticola is a flowering plant in the family Rhamnaceae and is endemic to the south-west of Western Australia. It is an erect or spreading shrub with linear or narrowly oblong to elliptic leaves and head-like clusters of white, tube-shaped flowers.

Description
The edges of the leaves are curved down, the upper surface densely covered with star-shaped hairs, the lower surface partly concealed.

Taxonomy and naming
Cryptandra monticola was first formally described in 1995 by Barbara Lynette Rye and Malcolm Eric Trudgen in the journal Nuytsia from specimens collected near the headquarters of the Karijini National Park in 1991. The specific epithet (monticola ) means "mountain-inhabitant", referring to its distribution on the two highest mountains in Western Australia.

Distribution and habitat

Conservation status
Cryptandra monticola is listed as "not threatened" by the Government of Western Australia Department of Biodiversity, Conservation and Attractions.

References

monticola
Rosales of Australia
Flora of Western Australia
Plants described in 1995
Taxa named by Barbara Lynette Rye
Taxa named by Malcolm Eric Trudgen